List of presidents of the National Assembly of Cameroon.

Below is a list of presidents of the Representative Assembly of Cameroon (ARCAM):

Below is a list of presidents of the Territorial Assembly of Cameroon (ATCAM):

Below is a list of presidents of the Legislative Assembly of Cameroon:

Below is a list of presidents of the National Assembly of Cameroon:

President of the Legislative Assembly (East Cameroon)

President of the Legislative Assembly (West Cameroon)

References

Politics of Cameroon
 
Lists of legislative speakers